Echinops exaltatus, the Russian globe thistle or tall globethistle, is European species of globe thistle in the family Asteraceae.  It is native to central and eastern Europe from Germany and Italy east into Russia. The species has escaped cultivation and become established in the wild in scattered locations in eastern Canada and the northern United States.

Description
Echinops exaltatus is the largest of all globe thistles, a branching perennial herb up to 150 cm (60 inches or 5 feet) tall. One plant can produces several flower heads, each with a very nearly spherical array of white or pale blue disc florets but no ray florets.

References

exaltatus
Flora of Europe
Plants described in 1811